Indieditum is a monotypic moth genus of the family Erebidae. Its only species, 
Indieditum subnilgiri, is known from the Nilgiri Mountains of southern India. Both the genus and the species were first described by Michael Fibiger in 2008.

The wingspan is about 10 mm. The forewing ground colour is brown, suffused with light brown and black scales. It is short, broad, with a well marked yellowish reniform stigma. The hindwing is without a discal spot, but the underside of the hindwing has an indistinct discal spot.

References

Micronoctuini
Noctuoidea genera
Monotypic moth genera